Majur is a village located in the municipality of Šabac, Serbia. The village has a Serb ethnic majority and its population numbered 7,031 inhabitants as of 2011 census.

See also
 List of places in Serbia
 Mačva

References

External links

Mačva
Populated places in Mačva District